The Midland railway line runs from Midland Junction to Walkaway (30 kilometres south of Geraldton) in Western Australia. Built by the Midland Railway of Western Australia, the 446 kilometre line opened in November 1894.

History

In December 1883, John Waddington representing a syndicate of English capitalists, proposed to Governor Broome to build a line from York via Northam, Newcastle, Bejoording, New Norcia and along the Berkshire Valley to Geraldton under a land grant scheme. A parliamentary select committee recommended the route be altered to branch off from the Eastern Railway at Guildford and run via Chittering, Bindoon, Victoria Plains, Carnamah, Arrino, Upper Irwin and Dongara to Walkaway where it would join the Western Australian Government Railway’s line from Geraldton. The agreement was signed on 27 February 1886, with work commencing a few days later.

The consortium was able to select land within  of the new railway. Financing problems delayed construction with construction being suspended in June 1887. The Government tried to rescind the contract, but could not as the consortium had until 1890 to complete the first 160 kilometres of the line.

On 21 March 1890, the Midland Railway Company of Western Australia was floated on the London Stock Exchange and Herbert Bond purchased John Waddington's shareholding in the consortium and work recommenced on the 446 kilometre line from both ends.

The first section from Midland Junction to Gingin opened on 9 April 1891, followed by Walkaway to Mingenew on 16 August 1891, Gin Gin to Moore River (Mogumbur) on 22 February 1892, Mingenew to Arrino on 25 February 1892, Mogumbur to Mora on 2 July 1894, with the two sections linked between Carnamah and Three Springs on 1 November 1894.

On 1 August 1964, the line was sold to the Western Australian Government Railways.

Services
The Midland Railway of Western Australia operated a weekly passenger train in each direction. After the sale of the line to the Western Australian Government Railways, it was relaunched as The Midlander. It ceased on 28 July 1975.

Today the line is primarily utilised by CBH Group grain trains operating to the ports of Geraldton and Kwinana from eight receival points.

References

External links

Flickr gallery

3 ft 6 in gauge railways in Australia
Railway lines in Western Australia
Railway lines opened in 1894
Wheatbelt (Western Australia)